The following is list of every song the American metal band Sunn O))) has officially released. It includes songs released on studio albums, live albums, EPs, singles, demos, various artist compilation albums, collaborative albums, remix albums, as well as songs exclusively released on limited-edition or international versions of albums. The list does not include unreleased tracks, unrecorded live tracks, bootleg recordings, or songs originally released on albums later added to a compilation.

Since forming in 1998, the Seattle-based band has released more than 130 tracks as of 2019.



Songs

References

External links 
Sunn O))) discography on Official Website
Sunn O))) discography on Discogs
Sunn O))) discography on Rate Your Music
Sunn O))) discography on Bandcamp
Sunn O))) Live Archives on Bandcamp

Sunn O